Summer Supercard was a multi-promotional professional wrestling supershow produced by Ring of Honor (ROH) also featuring wrestlers from Mexico's Consejo Mundial de Lucha Libre (CMLL) and Japan's New Japan Pro-Wrestling (NJPW) promotions and took place on August 9, 2019, at the Mattamy Athletic Centre in Toronto, Ontario, Canada. The event streamed live on Honor Club and FITE TV.

Background

Production
When the event was first announced, the National Wrestling Alliance (NWA) was also part of the event's co-production. Therefore, there was a NWA-sanctioned match scheduled to be on the card: Nick Aldis defending his NWA Worlds Heavyweight Championship against a Villain Enterprises member of Marty Scurll's choosing. However, on July 24, ROH and NWA ended their relationship agreement and the match was officially canceled.

Storylines
Summer Supercard featured professional wrestling matches, involving different wrestlers from pre-existing scripted feuds, plots, and storylines that played out on ROH's television programs. Wrestlers portrayed villains or heroes as they follow a series of events that build tension and culminate in a wrestling match or series of matches.

Results

Reception 
Stuart Carapola of Pro Wrestling Insider praised the majority of the matches, overall calling the show "terrific". Justin Knipper of Wrestling Observer Newsletter stated "this was a decent show, but the standout match featured six guys who aren’t even under contract to ROH." He went on to say that card "often felt flat, probably because of the stuffy booking, stale wrestling and a modest crowd." The bleachers in the arena were also described as "empty".

See also

2019 in professional wrestling
Professional wrestling in Canada

References

2019 in professional wrestling
2019 in Toronto
Events in Toronto
August 2019 events in Canada
Consejo Mundial de Lucha Libre co-promoted shows
New Japan Pro-Wrestling shows
Ring of Honor shows
Professional wrestling in Toronto
Professional wrestling joint events